Lunde may refer to:

People

Politics
Gulbrand Lunde (1901–1942), Norwegian councillor of state in the Nasjonal Samling government
Heidi Nordby Lunde (born 1973), Norwegian politician for the Conservative Party
Jens Lunde (1884–1974), Norwegian politician for the Farmers' Party
Karl Lunde (1892–1975), Norwegian politician for the Liberal Party
Kjellbjørg Lunde (born 1944), Norwegian politician for the Socialist Left Party

Sport

Sailors
Eugen Lunde (1887–1963), Norwegian sailor who competed in the 1924 Summer Olympics
Jeanette Lunde (born 1972), Norwegian sportsperson who competed in alpine skiing and sailing
Peder Lunde Jr. born 1942), Norwegian sailor and Olympic champion
Peder Lunde Sr. (1918–2009), Norwegian sailor and Olympic medalist
Vibeke Lunde (1921–1962), Norwegian sailor and Olympic medalist

Other sports
Bill Lunde (born 1975), American golfer
Bjarte Lunde Aarsheim (born 1975), Norwegian footballer
Jeanette Lunde (born 1972), Norwegian alpine skier and sailor
Katrine Lunde Haraldsen (born 1980), Norwegian team handball goalkeeper
Knut Lunde (1905–1960), Norwegian Nordic combined skier
Lars Lunde (born 1964), Danish football player
Len Lunde (1936–2010), Canadian ice hockey player 
Martin Lunde (born 1958), American wrestler better known as Arn Anderson
Nordal Lunde (1875–1942), Norwegian sports shooter
Siv Bråten Lunde (born 1960), Norwegian biathlete

Other fields
Anders Christian Lunde (1809-1886), Danish landscape painter
Barbara Kegerreis Lunde (born 1937), American physicist
Einar Lunde (born 1943), Norwegian news anchor
Guil Lunde, American voice actor
John Arthur Lunde (born 1948), Norwegian civil servant 
Ken Lunde (born 1965), American linguists specialist
Niels Lunde (born 1962), Danish writer and columnist on business and economical issues
Reidar Lunde (1911-1982), Norwegian newspaper editor
Sigurd Lunde (architect) (1874-1936), Norwegian architect
Sigurd Lunde (bishop) (1916-2006), Norwegian theologian, teacher, author, broadcaster, and Bishop of Stavanger
Stein Erik Lunde (born 1953), Norwegian novelist, children's writer, biographer and textbook writer
Tormod Lunde (born 1954), Norwegian sociologist
Øivind Lunde (born 1962), Norwegian bass guitarist
Øyvind Hegg-Lunde (born 1982), Norwegian musician (drums and percussion)

Places

Antarctica
Lunde Glacier, a Norwegian Antarctic territory
Mount Lunde, a mountain ridge in the Tula Mountains, Enderby Land, Antarctica

Denmark
Lunde, a parish in Nordfyn Municipality in the Region of Southern Denmark

Norway
Lunde, Kristiansand, a village in the municipality of Kristiansand, Agder county
Lunde, Sirdal (sometimes called Øvre Sirdal), a village in the municipality of Sirdal, Agder county
Lunde, Telemark, a former municipality in the old Telemark county
Lunde Station, a station on the Sørlandet Line located in the municipality of Nome, Vestfold og Telemark county

Sweden
Lunde, Sweden, a locality situated in the Municipality of Kramfors, Västernorrland County

Other uses
Lunde, the Norwegian name for the Atlantic puffin
Lunde Formation, a geologic formation in Norway

Danish-language surnames
Norwegian-language surnames